Sonja Veselinović (Serbian-Cyrillic: Соња Веселиновић; born 9 December 1981 in Novi Sad, Yugoslavia) is a Serbian writer and assistant professor of comparative literature at the Philosophical Faculty of the University of Novi Sad.

Biography
Sonja Veselinović studied comparative literature at the Faculty of Philosophy of the University of Novi Sad, graduated with Magister degree in 2009 and obtained her doctorate as PhD in 2014.  In 2016, she became assistant professor (docent) at the department of comparative literature of the university.

The literary scholar and artist is member of the editorial board of literary magazine Polja (Fields) since 2007. In the same year, she received the first prize of the Festival of Young Poets (Serbian: Festival mladih pesnika) in Zaječar. The best manuscript Poema preko (Poem across) was published as book a year later – a poem across the way of individual being. The narrator figure (first-person narrative) addresses Marina Tsvetaeva in dealing with the issues of identity, creativity and self-fulfillment. This fragmentary, intertextual and discursive prose searches for the limits of representation of subjectivity through different personas and vivid imagery. An excerpt of the work has been published in Hungarian and German translation. In 2009, she participated in a reading by Denny Rosenthal during the German Cultural Days Novi Sad, and she was supported by Borislav Pekić Foundation. Belgrade's Goethe-Institute selected her for participation as one of the Serbian artistic representants at the European Borderlands Festival 2010 of Allianz Cultural Foundation. She was invited guest of the Committee on Cultural and Media Affairs of the German Bundestag in cooperation with the Brandenburg Gate Foundation at the Leipzig Book Fair 2011. She is also laureate of the Isidora Sekulić Award 2013 for her prose Krosfejd. The title is the Serbian term for Crossfade. This prose can be described as mixture (crossfade) of two inner voices of the main character, its fragmented narration, intertextuality and imagery reflects motifs of longing for love and self-knowledge in searching for individual authenticity.

Veselinović compiled the work edition of Ivan V. Lalić for volume 86 of the anthology Ten Centuries of Serbian Literature of Matica srpska, and her study on specific topic from a novel of Danilo Kiš (child perspective in Garden, Ashes) has been published in volume 1 of Slavic studies of the University of Graz. The scholar gave a lecture on Yugoslav Black Wave at Martin Luther University of Halle-Wittenberg in 2018. So far, in addition to her scientific work, she devoted herself to the translation of few English and French works of John Ashbury, Jean Giraudoux, Milan Kundera and Jacques Rancière into Serbian.

Veselinović supports the protest movement 1 od 5 miliona.

She was member of Jury of Desanka Maksimović Awards 2018 and 2019.

Awards
 Isidora Sekulić Award, 2013

Bibliography (selection)
 Poema preko (Poem across), Dom omladine, Zaječar 2008, prose.
 Prevodilačka poetika Ivana V. Lalića (Translation Poetics of Ivan V. Lalić), Akademska knjiga, Novi Sad 2012, .
 Krosfejd, Kulturni centar Novog Sada, Novi Sad 2013, prose.
Kind und Jugendlicher in der Literatur und im Film Bosniens, Kroatiens und Serbiens (Child and Adolescent in the Literature and in the Film of Bosnia, Croatia and Serbia), edited by Renate Hansen-Kokoruš & Elena Popovska, Band 1, Grazer Studien zur Slawistik, Kovač, Hamburg 2013, .
 Recepcija, kanon, ciljna kultura : slika modernog angloameričkog pesništva u savremenoj srpskoj književnosti (Reception, canon, target culture:  picture of modern Anglo-American poetry in contemporary Serbian literature), Akademska knjiga, Novi Sad 2018, .

References

1981 births
Living people
Comparative literature academics
Literary scholars
Serbian literary theorists
Serbian women scientists
21st-century Serbian women writers
Serbian translators
Translators to Serbian
Translators from English
Translators from French
University of Novi Sad alumni
Academic staff of the University of Novi Sad
21st-century translators